Thestor protumnus, the Boland skolly, is a butterfly of the family Lycaenidae. It is only found in South Africa.

The wingspan is 22–37.5 mm for males and 24–42.5 mm for females. Adults are on wing from September to December and August to October in Namaqualand. Subspecies terblanchei is on wing from January to March. The peak flight times vary per locality.

The larvae feed on coccids (scale insects).

Subspecies
Thestor protumnus protumnus – Cape Peninsula, south-western Cape
Thestor protumnus aridus van Son, 1941 – Cape, Free State
Thestor protumnus terblanchei Henning & Henning, 1993 – Free State

References

Butterflies described in 1764
Thestor
Endemic butterflies of South Africa
Taxa named by Carl Linnaeus